Priscila Borja Moreno (born 28 April 1985) is a former Spanish footballer who played as a winger or forward for Primera División club Madrid CFF. She previously was a member of the Spain women's national team.

Club career
Coming from the ranks of Seville's CD Hispalis, she moved at 17 to Sabadell, where she won a national Cup. After Sabadell withdrew from the competition in 2005 she moved to Estudiantes Huelva, which disappeared following the end of the season. She then signed for Club Irex Puebla. When Puebla fused with AD Las Mercedes to form Extremadura FCF she returned to Huelva to play for Sporting, and signed for Atlético Madrid in 2009.

In 2021, Borja announced her retirement after a 20-year-long football career, with her final spell being at Madrid CFF.

International career
Following an outstanding 2010–11 season with Atlético, Borja was called for the first time by the senior Spanish national team for their first match in 2013 Euro qualifying, against Turkey. Borja started the match and contributed two goals to Spain's 10–1 win.

In June 2013, national team coach Ignacio Quereda confirmed Borja as a member of his 23-player squad for the UEFA Women's Euro 2013 finals in Sweden.

International goals
 2013 Euro qualification
 2 in Turkey 1–10 Spain (2011)
 Friendly
 1 in Spain 4–1 Austria (2012)
 2013 Euro qualification
 2 in Kazakhstan 13–0 Spain (2012)
 Friendly
 1 in Spain 2–2 Austria (2015)

Honours

Club
 CE  Sabadell
 Copa de la Reina de Fútbol (1): 2003
 Atlético Madrid
 Primera División (1): 2016–17
 Copa de la Reina de Fútbol (1): 2016

References

External links
 
 
 
Profile at Txapeldunak.com 

1985 births
Living people
People from Seville (comarca)
Sportspeople from the Province of Seville
Footballers from Andalusia
Spanish women's footballers
Women's association football wingers
Women's association football forwards
CE Sabadell Femení players
Sporting de Huelva players
Atlético Madrid Femenino players
Rayo Vallecano Femenino players
Real Betis Féminas players
Madrid CFF players
Primera División (women) players
Spain women's youth international footballers
Spain women's international footballers
2015 FIFA Women's World Cup players